Phania is a genus of flies in the family Tachinidae.

Species
P. albisquama (Villeneuve, 1924)
P. curvicauda (Fallén, 1820)
P. funesta (Meigen, 1824)
P. incrassata Pandellé, 1894
P. speculifrons (Villeneuve, 1919)
P. thoracica Meigen, 1824

References

Phasiinae
Diptera of Europe
Tachinidae genera
Taxa named by Johann Wilhelm Meigen